Mirzayev (and its variant Mirzaev) is a surname. People with the surname include:

Abdukarim Mirzayev (born 1982), Uzbek journalist and film director
Arif Mirzayev (born 1944), Azerbaijani composer
Bahatdin Mirzayev (1914–1987), Azerbaijani Red Army captain
Davron Mirzaev (born 1989), Uzbek football player
Hikmat Mirzayev, Azerbaijani military officer
Ilgar Mirzayev (1973–2020), Azerbaijani military officer 
Jalal Mirzayev (born 1977), Azerbaijani diplomat
Jeyhun Mirzayev (1946–1993), Azerbaijani actor and film director
Kamal Mirzayev (born 1994), Azerbaijani football player 
Murad Mirzayev (1976–2016), Azerbaijani military officer 
Osman Mirzayev (1937–1991), Azerbaijani Soviet journalist and writer
Ruslan Mirzayev (born 1989), Uzbek film producer and director
Sardor Mirzaev (born 1991), Uzbek football player
Shirin Mirzayev (1942–1992), Azerbaijani military officer
Turan Mirzayev (born 1979), Azerbaijani weightlifter
Yusif Mirzayev (1958–1993), Azerbaijani soldier

See also
 Mirza (disambiguation)

Azerbaijani-language surnames
Uzbek-language surnames